MFC 25: Vindication was a mixed martial arts event held by the Maximum Fighting Championship (MFC) on May 7, 2010 at the Edmonton Expo Centre in Edmonton, Alberta. The event aired live on HDNet. The main event featured Thales Leites taking on Jesse Taylor in a middleweight bout.

Background
A scheduled fight between David Heath and Solomon Hutcherson was cancelled due to an injury to Hutcherson.

Results

References

See also
 Maximum Fighting Championship
 List of Maximum Fighting Championship events
 2010 in Maximum Fighting Championship

25
2010 in mixed martial arts
Mixed martial arts in Canada
Sport in Edmonton
2010 in Canadian sports